Crataegus triflora is an uncommon hawthorn species of the south-eastern United States, of known by the common name three-flowered hawthorn.

The flowers are quite large for hawthorn flowers, and occur in small clusters (not necessarily exactly three to a cluster). Although rarely cultivated, it can be very attractive if well grown.

References

External links
 "Three-flowered Hawthorn, Crataegus triflora Chapman", (Floyd County, Northwest Georgia, Southeastern United States)

triflora
Flora of North America
Taxa named by Alvan Wentworth Chapman